Count Dénes Andrássy de Csíkszentkirály et Krasznahorka (19 November 1835 – 23 February 1913) was a Hungarian nobleman, who served as chairman of the Hungarian Heraldic and Genealogical Society. He was a wealthy, generous and enlightened patron of the arts.

His parents were Count György Andrássy and Countess Franciska Königsegg-Aulendorfi. He married Franciska Hablawetz. After her death he founded Franciska Relic Museum in his birthplace.

He was a member of the Hungarian Academy of Sciences.

External links
 Magyar életrajzi lexikon III.: Kiegészítő kötet (A–Z). ed. Ágnes Kenyeres. Budapest. Akadémiai Kiadó. 1981. p. 12.

1835 births
1913 deaths
Members of the Hungarian Academy of Sciences
Denes